Durable medical equipment is any medical equipment used in the home to aid in a better quality of living. It is a benefit included in many insurance policies and in some cases covered by Medicare benefits. The item is defined by Title XIX for Medicaid:

(n) The term "durable medical equipment" includes iron lungs, oxygen tents, Nebulizers, CPAP, catheters, hospital beds, and wheelchairs (which may include a power-operated vehicle that may be appropriately used as a wheelchair, but only where the use of such a vehicle is determined to be necessary on the basis of the individual's medical and physical condition and the vehicle meets such safety requirements as the Secretary may prescribe) used in the patient's home (including an institution used as his home other than an institution that meets the requirements of subsection (e)(1) of this section or section 1819(a)(1)), whether furnished on a rental basis or purchased, and includes blood-testing strips and blood glucose monitors for individuals with diabetes without regard to whether the individual has Type I or Type II diabetes or to the individual's use of insulin (as determined under standards established by the Secretary in consultation with the appropriate organizations); except that such term does not include such equipment furnished by a supplier who has used, for the demonstration and use of specific equipment, an individual who has not met such minimum training standards as the Secretary may establish with respect to the demonstration and use of such specific equipment. With respect to a seat-lift chair, such term includes only the seat-lift mechanism and does not include the chair.

See also
Certificate of medical necessity
Home medical equipment
Medical device
Medical equipment
Loan closet

References
 

Medical equipment